Ursus Wehrli (born 1969) is a Swiss comedian and artist. He makes books in which he "tidies up" works of art.

In 2012, he designed a stamp for the Swiss Post.

Books 
 Kunst aufräumen, Zürich, Kein & Aber, 2002, .
 Noch mehr Kunst aufräumen, Zürich, Kein & Aber, 2004, .
 Both volumes were published also in French, Italian and English:
 L'art en bazar, Éditions Milan (Fr.)
 L'arte a soqquadro, Edizione il Castoro (Itl.)
 Tidying Up Art, Prestel Publishing (Engl.)
 Die Kunst, aufzuräumen, Zürich, Kein & Aber, 2011, .

Notes and references

See also 
 List of TED speakers

External links 

 Official website
 "Ursus Wehrli tidies up art" (TED talk, 2006)

Swiss contemporary artists
Swiss photographers
Swiss cabaret performers
1969 births
Living people